Diplolaena angustifolia, commonly known as Yanchep rose, is a shrub which is endemic to the area around Perth in Western Australia.

Description
It has linear to narrowly oblong shaped leaves with a recurved to revolute margin. The Yanchep Rose has many small flowers with long bright stamens  that are crowded in to heads surrounded by petal-like bracts, so that the whole resembles  a many-stamened single flower. It is a winter-flowering shrub that usually blooms between June and October.

Taxonomy
The species was first formally described by the botanist William Jackson Hooker in the work Botanical Magazine published in 1843. Synonyms include; Diplolaena salicifolia, Diplolaena salicifolia var. revoluta and Diplolaena salicifolia var. salicifolia.

Distribution
It has a scattered distribution along the coast and slightly inland between Perth in the south as far north as Dongara in the Wheatbelt region of Western Australia. The shrub is often found on sand dunes, limestone hills and rocky ridges growing in sandy soils.

References

External links
 http://www.plantthis.com.au/plant-information.asp?gardener=12934

Sapindales of Australia
Rosids of Western Australia
Garden plants of Australia
Plants described in 1843
Taxa named by William Jackson Hooker
Zanthoxyloideae